Delphine is a feminine Francophone given name, a form of the Latin Delphina, meaning woman from Delphi. Delphine of Glandèves was a 14th-century nun from Provence. Notable people with the name include:

 Delfina Potocka (1807–1877), Polish countess, a friend and muse to artists Frédéric Chopin and Zygmunt Krasiński 
 Delphine Arnault (born 1975), French businesswoman, director and executive vice president of Louis Vuitton (LVMH Group)
 Delphine Atangana (born 1984), Cameroonian sprinter who specialized in the 100 metres
 Delphine Batho (born 1973), French politician
 Delphine Biscaye, French mechanical engineer and designer
 Delphine Blanc (born 1983), French football player
 Princess Delphine of Belgium (born 1968), illegitimate daughter of King Albert II of Belgium and Baroness Sybille de Selys Longchamps
 Delphine Cascarino (born 1997), French professional football player, 5-time UEFA Women's Champions League winner
 Delphine O (born 1985), French-Korean politician and former MP for Paris for Renaissance
 Delphine Chanéac (born 1978), French actress
 Delphine Combe (born 1974), French sprinter
 Delphine de Custine (1770–1826), French literary and society figure
 Delphine Ernotte (born 1966), French businesswoman
 Delphine de Girardin (1804–1855), French author under the pen name Vicomte Delaunay
 Delphine Galou (born 1977), French-born contralto
 Delphine Gény-Stephann (born 1968), French engineer, current Secretary of State under Minister of Economy and Finance Bruno Le Maire
 Delphine Gleize (born 1973), French film director and screenwriter
 Delphine Minoui (born 1974), French-Iranian investigative journalist, social scientist and author
Delphine Hanna (1854–1941), American physical education professor
 Delphine Horvilleur (born 1974), prominent French rabbi, co-leader of the Liberal Jewish Movement of France
 Delphine LaLaurie (1787–1849), New Orleans socialite and murderer
 Delphine Lecompte (born 1978), Flemish poet
 Delphine Levy (1969–2020), French manager of cultural institutions
 Delphine Neid, a bassist in the band The Nuns
 Delphine Oggeri (born 1973), French ski mountaineer
 Delphine Py-Bilot (born 1979), professional French triathlete
 Delphine Seyrig (1932–1990), French actress
 Delphine de Vigan (born 1966), Award-winning French novelist 
 Delphine Wespiser (born 1992), Miss Alsace 2011 and Miss France 2012
 Delphine Zanga Tsogo (1935–2020), Cameroonian writer and politician
 Belle Delphine (born 1999), Mary-Belle Kirschner, professionally known as Belle Delphine, South African-born English internet celebrity, pornographic actress, model, and YouTuber

Fictional characters
 Delphine d'Albémar, titular heroine in the eponymous Delphine, infamous epistolary novel by Germaine de Staël
 Delphine de Nucingen, recurrent character in Honoré de Balzac's La Comédie Humaine
 Captain Delphine Angua von Überwald, a character from Terry Pratchett's Discworld
 Delphine, a character in Power Rangers
 Delphine, a character in the 2011 game The Elder Scrolls V: Skyrim
 Delphine Cormier, a character on Orphan Black played by Évelyne Brochu
 Delphine Lasalle, undercover French intelligence agent in the 2017 film Atomic Blonde
 Delphine Day, a character from ITV's Mr Selfridge
 Delphine Donkey, a character in the British children's cartoon Peppa Pig
 Delphine, a character from ITV TV series Plebs
 Delphine Watzka, the protagonist of the 2003 novel The Master Butchers Singing Club

See also
 Delphine (disambiguation)

French feminine given names